Peter John Stevens (born 1 June 1995) is a Slovenian swimmer.

He won the title of youth world champion in the 50-metre breaststroke in 2013. In 2016, he won silver in the same discipline seconds at the 50-metre breaststroke on the European Aquatic Championships in London, with time of 27.09 seconds. This was his first medal from a senior competition. In 2016, he won the silver medal at the 50 m breaststroke on the short-course World Swimming Championships, breaking the Slovenian national record at 25.85.

Stevens is son of an English father and Slovenian mother. His family lives in Medvode.  he is a student at the University of Tennessee.

International Swimming League 
In 2019 he was member of the 2019 International Swimming League representing Team Iron. He was co-captain of the team alongside Katinka Hosszú.

References

Slovenian male swimmers
Living people
1995 births
Sportspeople from Kranj
European Aquatics Championships medalists in swimming
Male breaststroke swimmers
Medalists at the FINA World Swimming Championships (25 m)
Mediterranean Games bronze medalists for Slovenia
Mediterranean Games medalists in swimming
Swimmers at the 2018 Mediterranean Games
Swimmers at the 2022 Mediterranean Games
Slovenian people of English descent
20th-century Slovenian people
21st-century Slovenian people